The women's 800 metres T54 event at the 2020 Summer Paralympics in Tokyo, took place on 29 August 2021.

Records
Prior to the competition, the existing records were as follows:

Results

Heats
Heat 1 took place on 29 August 2021, at 10:57:

Heat 2 took place on 29 August 2021, at 11:07:

Final
The final took place on 29 August 2021, at 19:17:

References

Women's 800 metres T54
2021 in women's athletics